The Naked Citizen is a movie written and directed by Başar Sabuncu and starring Şener Şen. It tells about the troubles of the middle class (officer) section of the period and a period of the life of İbrahim, who was overwhelmed by these troubles.

Story 
İbrahim is a civil servant, begins to suffer from financial difficulties. Although he does a lot of additional work, his economic situation is getting worse and worse. Finally, he loses himself and undresses, and starts running in the middle of a street. He became known as the Naked Citizen after the media discovered the incident. In this way, he will earn thousands of times the amount of money he could not earn as an honest officer.

Cast 

 Şener Şen
 Nilgün Akçaoğlu
 Candan Sabuncu
 Ertuğrul Bilda
 Erdinç Bora
 Erhan Dilligil
 Renan Fosforoğlu
 Salih Kalyon
 Hikmet Karagöz
 Pekcan Koşar
 Zihni Küçümen
 Burçin Terzioğlu
 Kamran Usluer
 Bilge Zobu

References 

1985 drama films
Films set in Istanbul
Films shot in Istanbul
Turkish comedy-drama films
1985 films